The Canadian National Police Service (commonly referred to as the CN Police) is a private railroad police force protecting the property, personnel, and rail infrastructure of the Canadian National Railway in Canada and the United States.

History
Established in 1923 upon the amalgamation of several railway companies, the Government of Canada established the Canadian National Railway Police. Currently, CN Police officers operate in 8 Canadian Provinces and in 16 U.S. States.

In Canada, the BC Rail Police amalgamated into the CN Police Service in 2005. In the United States, four railway police services: the Illinois Central Railroad Police, the Grand Trunk Railway Police, the EJ&E, and the Wisconsin Central Transportation Police also amalgamated into the CN Police Service.

Jurisdiction

Canada 
In Canada, members are federally sworn in under section 44.1 of the Railway Safety Act granting powers as police constables and have the same powers of arrest as any police officer in Canada anywhere in Canada as 'Peace Officers' under Section 2 of the Criminal Code.  Police constables are employed by Canadian National and are also considered public servants, sworn to the Crown to uphold the law and protect.

The CN Police federal oath of office primarily directs their duties 'on and along' CN infrastructure, protecting properties owned and administered by CN. CN Police have additional provincial appointments which allow them to extend provincial enforcement such as the Highway Traffic Act outside the boundaries set under the Railway Safety Act of Canada.

Under section 26.1 of the Railway Safety Act, it is an offence for any person to "enter on land on which a line work is situated". Offenders can be dealt with in multiple ways such as being compelled to Federal Court by means of a promise to appear, or being issued a ticket through the relevant provincial Contravention Act and released. Maximum penalties for contravention of the act for any offence can be up to a $10,000 fine and imprisonment in the case of a private person. A company may also face up to a $200,000 fine for contravention of this act.

United States 
In the U.S., each state in which CN operates grants police powers to CN police officers and special agents.  State specific powers are also augmented by interstate authority granted by the United States Secretary of Transportation (Code 49 U.S.C. 28101), meaning officers have police powers related to the railway in all states the CN railway operates.  Individual states may expand this authority within their borders.

Offices and detachments

Canada
The CN Police Canadian headquarters is located in Montreal, Quebec with regional offices in Toronto, Ontario; Winnipeg, Manitoba; Edmonton, Alberta; and Vancouver, British Columbia.

The CN Police operates further detachments in British Columbia (Kamloops, Prince George, Squamish, Surrey, and Prince Rupert); Alberta (Calgary, Jasper, and Lloydminster); Saskatchewan (Melville, Saskatoon, Lloydminster, and Regina); Manitoba (Brandon); Ontario (Brampton, Brantford, Cornwall, Capreol, Belleville, Fort Frances, Hamilton, London, Niagara Falls, Oakville, Sarnia, Thunder Bay, and Vaughan); Quebec (Charny, Limoilou, Quebec City, Rivière-des-Prairies, Saint-Lambert, and Shawinigan); New Brunswick (Moncton); and Nova Scotia (Halifax).

United States 
The CN Police United States Headquarters is located in Homewood, Illinois with detachments in Illinois (Harvey and Centralia); Indiana (Gary); Iowa (Waterloo); Michigan (Detroit and Lansing); Tennessee (Memphis);  Mississippi (Jackson); Louisiana (New Orleans); Wisconsin (Fond du Lac, Green Bay, Stevens Point, and Superior); and Pennsylvania (Greenville).

See also
Other private railroad police departments:
 Amtrak Police
 BNSF Police Department
 Canadian Pacific Police Service
 Union Pacific Police Department

References

External links 
 CN Police Service

1923 establishments in Canada
Railroad police agencies
Canadian National Railway
Railroad police departments of the United States
Private police
Private police in the United States
Organizations based in Illinois
Organizations based in Montreal